Arivechi Municipality is a municipality of Sonora in north-western Mexico.

Borders
It has boundaries in the north, east, and south with Sahuaripa Municipality and in the west with Bacanora Municipality.

Area
The area of the municipality (urban and rural) is 738.8 square kilometers.

Population
In the 2005 census, the population was 1,280 inhabitants, 866 of whom lived in the municipal seat. . In the 2018 census, the population of the municipality was 2308.

References

Municipalities of Sonora